Zofia Anna Grabczan, née Walczyna (born 28 May 1962 in Radzyń Podlaski) is a Polish politician. She was elected to Sejm on 25 September 2005, getting 5971 votes in 7 Chełm district as a candidate from Samoobrona Rzeczpospolitej Polskiej list.

See also
Members of Polish Sejm 2005-2007

External links
Zofia Grabczan - parliamentary page - includes declarations of interest, voting record, and transcripts of speeches.

1962 births
Living people
People from Radzyń Podlaski
Members of the Polish Sejm 2005–2007
Women members of the Sejm of the Republic of Poland
Self-Defence of the Republic of Poland politicians
21st-century Polish women politicians
Polish trade unionists